Mbemba Sylla (born 14 July 1982 in Conakry) is a Guineean former footballer.

Honours
FC Vaslui
Liga II: 2004–05

External links

1978 births
Living people
Guinean footballers
Expatriate footballers in Belgium
Belgian Pro League players
RFC Liège players
R.A.E.C. Mons players
Expatriate footballers in Romania
Liga I players
Liga II players
FC Progresul București players
FC Vaslui players
Expatriate footballers in Indonesia
Indonesian Premier League players
PSIR Rembang players
Sportspeople from Conakry
Expatriate soccer players in South Africa
Association football defenders
Sivutsa Stars F.C. players
African Warriors F.C. players